Bow wow is onomatopoeia for a dog's bark.

Bow Wow may also refer to:

Music
 Bow Wow (rapper) (formerly Lil' Bow Wow) (born 1987), American rapper and actor
 Bow Wow (band) (a.k.a. Vow Wow), a Japanese hard rock/heavy metal band
 Bow Wow Wow, a UK new wave band

Songs
 "Bow Wow (That's My Name)", a 2000 song by Lil' Bow Wow
 "Bow Wow", a 2003 song by The Fiery Furnaces Gallowsbird's Bark
 "Bow Wow Blues (My Mama Treat Me like a Dog)", a 1921 song by Cliff Friend & Nat Osborne

Other uses
 Bow Wow (manga), Japanese manga
 Bow Wow Sauce, a sauce developed in the Cotswolds region of England
 Bow-wow theory, theory regarding the origins of human sounds